Isaäc Arend "Iek" Diepenhorst (18 July 1916 – 21 August 2004) was a Dutch politician of the defunct Anti-Revolutionary Party (ARP) and later the Christian Democratic Appeal (CDA) party and jurist.

Diepenhorst applied at the Free University Amsterdam in June 1934 majoring in Law and Theology and obtaining Bachelor of Laws and Bachelor of Theology degrees in July 1936 and worked as a student researcher before graduating with a Master of Laws degree in September 1937 and a Master of Theology degree in March 1940 and later got a doctorate as an Doctor of Law on 10 June 1943. Diepenhorst worked as a professor of Criminal law and Criminal procedure at the Free University Amsterdam serving from October 1945 until April 1965. Diepenhorst also worked as a radio presenter and political pundit for the Dutch Christian Radio Association (NCRV) from April 1951 until September 1963. Diepenhorst was elected as a Member of the Senate after the Senate election of 1952, taking office on 15 July 1952. He also served as Rector Magnificus of the Free University Amsterdam from 1 January 1960 until 1 January 1961. On 27 February 1965 the Cabinet Marijnen fell and continued to serve in a demissionary capacity until the cabinet formation of 1965 when it was replaced by Cabinet Cals with Diepenhorst appointed as Minister of Education and Sciences, taking office on 14 April 1965. The Cabinet Cals fell just one year later on 14 October 1966 and continued to serve in a demissionary capacity until it was replaced by the caretaker Cabinet Zijlstra with Diepenhorst continuing as Minister of Education and Sciences, taking office on 22 November 1966. Diepenhorst was elected as a Member of the House of Representatives after the election of 1967, taking office on 23 February 1967. After the cabinet formation of 1967 Diepenhorst was not giving a cabinet post in the new cabinet, the Cabinet Zijlstra was replaced by the Cabinet De Jong on 5 April 1967 and he continued to serve in the House of Representatives as a frontbencher.

Diepenhorst returned as a distinguished professor of Constitutional law, Administrative law and Governmental studies at the Free University Amsterdam serving from 23 February 1967 until 28 September 1984 and also as a distinguished professor of Parliamentary History from 1 September 1976 until 28 September 1984. He also served again as Rector Magnificus of the Free University Amsterdam from 1 September 1972 until 1 September 1976. In January 1971 Diepenhorst announced that he wouldn't stand for the election of 1971 but wanted tot return to the Senate. After the Senate election of 1971 Diepenhorst returned to the Senate, he resigned as a Member of the House of Representatives the day he was installed as a Member of the Senate, serving from 11 May 1971 until 17 September 1974 and again from 29 October 1974 until 10 June 1981 serving as a frontbencher chairing several parliamentary committees. Diepenhorst also became active in the public sector occupying numerous seats as a nonprofit director on several boards of directors and supervisory boards (Royal Academy of Arts and Sciences, Netherlands Bible Society, Bartiméus Foundation and the Utrecht University) and served on several state commissions and councils on behalf of the government (Education Council, Probation Agency and the Council for Culture).

Decorations

References

External links

Official
  Mr.Dr. I.A. (Isaäc) Diepenhorst Parlement & Politiek
  Mr.Dr. I.A. Diepenhorst (CDA) Eerste Kamer der Staten-Generaal

 

 
 

1916 births
2004 deaths
Anti-Revolutionary Party politicians
Christian Democratic Appeal politicians
Commanders of the Order of Orange-Nassau
Commanders of the Order of the Netherlands Lion
Dutch academic administrators
Dutch education writers
Dutch legal scholars
Dutch magazine editors
Dutch nonprofit directors
Dutch nonprofit executives
Dutch political commentators
Dutch radio presenters
Dutch scholars of constitutional law
Dutch television personalities
Governmental studies academics
Ministers of Education of the Netherlands
Members of the House of Representatives (Netherlands)
Members of the Senate (Netherlands)
Politicians from Rotterdam
People from Zeist
Political historians
Protestant Church Christians from the Netherlands
Rectors of universities in the Netherlands
Reformed Churches Christians from the Netherlands
Scholars of administrative law
Scholars of criminal law
Academic staff of Utrecht University
Vrije Universiteit Amsterdam alumni
Academic staff of Vrije Universiteit Amsterdam
20th-century Dutch civil servants
20th-century Dutch historians
20th-century Dutch jurists
20th-century Dutch male writers
20th-century Dutch politicians